Swiftown (also known as Ezra), is an unincorporated community located in Leflore County, Mississippi, United States. It is part of the Greenwood, Mississippi micropolitan area. Swiftown's ZIP code is 38959.

Swiftown is located on the former Columbus and Greenville Railroad. A post office operated under the name Ezra from 1886 to 1911 and began operating under the name Swiftown in 1911.

Notable person
 William Cousins (1927-2018), Illinois Appellate Court judge and Chicago City Council member, was born in Swiftown.

Gallery

References

Unincorporated communities in Leflore County, Mississippi
Unincorporated communities in Mississippi
Greenwood, Mississippi micropolitan area